Cyhl Quarles (pronounced "Kyle") (born April 6, 1989) is a former American Football strong safety. He signed with the Baltimore Ravens as an undrafted free agent. He played college football at Wake Forest.

Early years
Quarles grew up on Singleton Road in the neighborhood of Gladiator, which is located in Norcross, Georgia. Quarles attended Meadowcreek High School, also in Norcross. Quarles was ranked as the 88th-best safety nationally by Scout and also was ranked as 49th-best prospect of the state of Georgia. He was a sprinter on the track high school team in which he ran the 100 meter dash 10.68 seconds. Quarles was named the Atlanta Journal-Constitution Defensive Player of the Week once during high school.

College career
Quarles played at Wake Forest. For his career at Wake Forest, he finished with 239 tackles, 2 interceptions, 6 passes defended and one forced fumble.

In his senior year, he had a career-high 101 tackles, 3 passes defended and 2 fumble recoveries. On September 1, 2011, he had 10 tackles against Syracuse in the season opener but Wake Forest loss 36-29 in overtime. On September 10, 2011, he recorded 12 tackles along with one pass deflection against North Carolina State helping Wake Forest win 34-27. On September 17, 2011, he recorded 5 tackles against Gardner-Webb helping Wake Forest win that game 48-5.

In his junior year, he had 71 tackles, one interception, one forced fumble and one passes defended.

In his sophomore year, he had 62 tackles, one interception, 2 passes defended for the season.

In his freshman year, he only had 5 tackles for the entire season.

Professional career

2012 NFL Combine

Baltimore Ravens
On April 30, 2012, Quarles signed with the Baltimore Ravens as an undrafted free agent. On August 31, 2012, he was released.

New England Patriots
On September 12, 2012, Quarles signed with the New England Patriots to join their practice squad. On September 28, 2012, Quarles was released from the practice squad. On December 26, 2012, Quarles re-signed with the team to join the practice squad.

Chicago Bears
On January 28, 2013, Quarles signed with the Chicago Bears to a reserve/future contract.

On August 11, 2013, Quarles was waived by the Bears.

References

External links
 Chicago Bears bio 
 Wake Forest bio 
 Baltimore Ravens bio 
 New England Patriots bio

1989 births
Living people
Chicago Bears players
New England Patriots players
Baltimore Ravens players
Wake Forest Demon Deacons football players
Players of American football from Georgia (U.S. state)